Basile Boli (born 2 January 1967) is a Ivorian-born French former professional footballer who played as a defender, and a current television sports presenter. He spent the majority of his career with Auxerre and Marseille before ending his career with spells at Scottish club Rangers, at Monaco, and at Japanese side Urawa Reds. At international level, he made 45 appearances and scored one goal representing the France national team.

Career
Born in Abidjan, Ivory Coast, Boli moved to France at an early age and began his career in local youth football in Paris before signing for AJ Auxerre in 1982. A powerful defender, Boli made his way into the Auxerre first team and soon made his debut for the France national team in 1986 for whom he went on to win 45 caps. His form meant that he soon became a transfer target for the leading clubs in France. Finally in 1990 Boli signed for Olympique de Marseille who, under Bernard Tapie, were fast becoming the leading club in France. Boli starred as the club won Ligue 1 in 1991 and 1992 and was also a regular in the club's 1992–93 UEFA Champions League campaign, topping the season off by scoring the only goal of the final against A.C. Milan that gave the cup to OM. Whilst at the club he even joined teammate Chris Waddle in recording a song entitled 'We've Got a Feeling'. He is remembered by football fans in England for his appearance for France against the England team in Euro 92 where he headbutted Stuart Pearce.

Despite his success at Marseille Boli was forced to leave in 1994 following revelations of a match fixing scandal and the relegation of the club. He signed for Rangers for £2 million in the summer of that year and went on to make 28 league appearances (two goals) during the 1994–95 season, securing a league winners' medal. Boli left Rangers at the end of that season and wound down his career with a season back in France with AS Monaco FC before ending his career in 1997 after a spell in Japan with Urawa Red Diamonds.

Danse avec les stars
 In 2018 he participated in season 9 of Danse avec les stars (the French version of Dancing with the Stars) with his partner Katrina Patchett and finished 7th out of 11 contestants.
This table shows the route of Basile Boli and Katrina Patchett in Danse Avec Les Stars.
Face to face aren't rated.

Personal life
Basile is the uncle of current players Yannick Boli, Charles Boli, and Kévin Boli, and is the younger brother of former striker Roger Boli.

Career statistics

Club

International

Scores and results list France's goal tally first, score column indicates score after each Boli goal.

Honours
Marseille
Division 1: 1990–91, 1991–92
UEFA Champions League: 1992–93

Rangers
Scottish Football League Premier Division: 1994–95

Individual
Division 1 Rookie of the Year: 1984
Etoile d'Or: 1989
The Dream Team 110 years of OM: 2010

Orders
Chevalier of the Légion d'honneur: 2008

References

External links

Profile of Rangers career
Basile Boli at IMDB

 
 

1967 births
Living people
Footballers from Abidjan
French footballers
France international footballers
Association football defenders
AJ Auxerre players
Olympique de Marseille players
Rangers F.C. players
AS Monaco FC players
Urawa Red Diamonds players
Ligue 1 players
Scottish Football League players
J1 League players
UEFA Champions League winning players
UEFA Euro 1992 players
French expatriate footballers
Expatriate footballers in Japan
Expatriate footballers in Scotland
French expatriate sportspeople in Japan
French expatriate sportspeople in Scotland
Black French sportspeople
Ivorian emigrants to France
Chevaliers of the Légion d'honneur
Boli family